The Rite of Strings is a collaborative album by virtuosi Al Di Meola, Stanley Clarke and Jean-Luc Ponty, recorded after their world tour in 1995. The album was recorded at Studio 56, Hollywood.

The trio reunited for a performance at the French jazz festival called "Jazz in Marciac" in 2007.

Material from the album was performed on tour by Trio! in 2005, also featuring Clarke and Ponty, with Béla Fleck on banjo instead of Di Meola on guitar.

Track listing
"Indigo" (Al Di Meola) – 7:15
"Renaissance" (Jean-Luc Ponty) – 4:33
"Song to John" (Stanley Clarke, Chick Corea) – 6:00
Dedicated to the memory of John Coltrane
"Chilean Pipe Song" (Di Meola) – 6:12
"Topanga" (Clarke) – 5:50
"Morocco" (Di Meola) – 5:45
"Change of Life" (Ponty) – 5:30
"La Cancion De Sofia" (Clarke) – 8:30
"Memory Canyon" (Ponty) – 6:00

Personnel 
 Al Di Meola –  guitar
 Stanley Clarke – double bass
 Jean-Luc Ponty –  violin

Chart performance

References

1995 albums
Al Di Meola albums
Jean-Luc Ponty albums
Stanley Clarke albums
Collaborative albums
Albums produced by Stanley Clarke